Edmond Tarverdyan is an Armenian mixed martial arts (MMA) trainer who co-owns Glendale Fighting Club in Glendale, California. He has trained former UFC Bamtamweight Champion Ronda Rousey, Travis Browne, Jake Ellenberger, boxer Art Hovhannisyan and  Edmen Shahbazyan.

Edmond Tarverdyan credentials as a professional fight trainer and the quality of his boxing training have often drawn ridicule and mockery from the media and the MMA community. Tarverdyan got into trouble with the California State Athletic Commission about lying about his arrest history leading to corner licence being revoked. The major criticism being his fighter's skills seem to stagnate or decline under his coaching methods.

Career

Edmond Tarverdyan has being praticising martial arts since he was 16, this resulted in Tarverdyan winning the WBC International Muay thai title. After retiring from professional fighting Taverdyan took up teaching MMA.

Media

Tarverdyan was a coach on The Ultimate Fighter: Team Rousey vs. Team Tate.

References

External links

 

1981 births
People from Vanadzor
Armenian male kickboxers
Boxing trainers
Mixed martial arts trainers
Martial arts school founders
Living people
Armenian Muay Thai practitioners
Armenian male mixed martial artists
Mixed martial artists utilizing Muay Thai
Mixed martial artists utilizing boxing